White Rock is an unincorporated community in Goodhue County, Minnesota, United States.

White Rock is located within Belle Creek Township and Vasa Township.  Belle Creek flows through the community.

Nearby places include Cannon Falls, Goodhue, Ryan, Hader, Vasa, Welch, and Red Wing.  White Rock is located nine miles east-southeast of Cannon Falls.  White Rock is located 11 miles northwest of Goodhue; and 15 miles southwest of Red Wing.

References

Unincorporated communities in Minnesota
Unincorporated communities in Goodhue County, Minnesota